Glycocaulis abyssi is a bacterium from the genus of Glycocaulis which has been isolated from a deep-sea hydrothermal vent near the Vancouver Island in Canada.

References 

Caulobacterales
Bacteria described in 2013